Sawbones may refer to:
 Sawbones, slang for a surgeon
 Sawbones, an artificial bone developed by Pacific Research Laboratories
 Sawbones (podcast), a 2013 podcast distributed by Maximum Fun
 Sawbones (film), a 1995 American film

See also
Bonesaw